Vinayak Nimhan (died 26 October 2022) was Shiv Sena politician from Pune, Maharashtra. He was member of the 12th Maharashtra Legislative Assembly representing the Shivajinagar Assembly Constituency. He had been elected to Maharashtra Legislative Assembly for three consecutive terms. For his first two terms, he was elected as a member of the Shivsena. For his third term, he was elected on the Indian National Congress ticket. In Nimhan was defeated in the 2014 assembly elections. He has since then returned to the Shivsena.

Nimhan died from cardiac arrest on 26 October 2022, at the age of 59.

Positions held
 1999: elected to Maharashtra Legislative Assembly
 2004: re-elected to Maharashtra Legislative Assembly
 2009: re-elected to Maharashtra Legislative Assembly
 2015: appointed as Pune City Chief Shiv Sena

See also
 Pune Lok Sabha constituency

References

External links
 Shiv Sena Official website
 शिवसेनेचा जिल्हाधिकारी कार्यालयावर ‘वरण-भात मोर्चा’
 Sena blames coalition partner BJP for price rise

Year of birth missing
20th-century births
2022 deaths
Maharashtra MLAs 2009–2014
Maharashtra MLAs 2004–2009
Maharashtra MLAs 1999–2004
Shiv Sena politicians
People from Pune district
Marathi politicians
Indian National Congress politicians
Maharashtra Navnirman Sena politicians